The Kolar is a right bank tributary of the Narmada River. It flows for a total length of 101 km, all of which is in the state of Madhya Pradesh.

River Basin 
The Kolar river arises in the Vindhya Range of Sehore district and flows in a south westerly direction to meet the Narmada at village neelkanth near Nasrullahganj in the Sehore district of Madhya Pradesh. Its total drainage area is of 1,347 km2. is spread across the two districts. The upper part of the river basin lies at an elevation of 350 to 600 metres and much of it is under tropical deciduous forest. The river debouches into the plains near Jholiapur. Much of the upper basin has poor soils and agriculture here is largely of wheat and gram. The lower basin has better soils and a flatter slope and has been used extensively bunded allowing for impounding water during the monsoons.

Kolar Dam 
Near Lawakhadi in Sehore, the Kolar Dam, a masonry dam has been built across the river and it provides about 70% filtered water to Bhopal city and provides for irrigation and inland fisheries.

References 

Rivers of Madhya Pradesh
Tributaries of the Narmada River
Rivers of India